James Patrick Beirne (October 15, 1946 – May 28, 2021) was an American professional football player who was a wide receiver. He played college football at Purdue University, where he was an All-American. He played professionally for the Houston Oilers of the American Football League (AFL) and was named an AFL All-Star in 1969. He later played in the National Football League (NFL) for the Oilers and San Diego Chargers. 

Beirne lived in Fredericksburg, Texas.

His son, Kevin Beirne, was a Major League Baseball right-handed pitcher from 2000–2006.

See also
 Other American Football League players

References 

1946 births
2021 deaths
American football wide receivers
Purdue Boilermakers football players
Houston Oilers players
San Diego Chargers players
American Football League All-Star players
Sportspeople from McKeesport, Pennsylvania
Players of American football from Pennsylvania
American Football League players